The Ewart Building is a historic commercial skyscraper located at 921-925 Liberty Avenue in Pittsburgh, Pennsylvania.

Description and history 
The building was built in 1891 in the Richardsonian Romanesque style for a wholesale grocer, Samuel Ewart. His family continued to run the business until 1925 and owned the building until 1969. It is built on part of the site of old Fort Fayette.

It was listed on the National Register of Historic Places on August 9, 1979.

References

Commercial buildings on the National Register of Historic Places in Pennsylvania
Romanesque Revival architecture in Pennsylvania
Commercial buildings completed in 1891
Commercial buildings in Pittsburgh
National Register of Historic Places in Pittsburgh